Danijel Mićić (born 18 October 1988) is an Austrian footballer who plays for Wacker Innsbruck in the Austrian Bundesliga.

References

1988 births
Living people
Austrian footballers
Austrian Football Bundesliga players
Kapfenberger SV players
Wolfsberger AC players
Austrian people of Serbian descent

Association football midfielders
Yugoslav emigrants to Austria
Footballers from Carinthia (state)
FC Wacker Innsbruck (2002) players